Marpi Reef or Marpi Bank is a narrow seamount lies  north of Saipan. The peak of the seamount is at 26 fathoms or 53 m under water surfaces.

It is one of fishing points in the region, and various cetaceans (whales and dolphins) migrate and live in the waters including humpback whales.

References

External links
 Saipan Island (& Marpi Bank) - the Pacific Islands Benthic Habitat Mapping Center

Geography of the Northern Mariana Islands
Seamounts of the Pacific Ocean
Reefs of the United States
Reefs of the Pacific Ocean